Wilfrid Jaures Kaptoum (born 7 July 1996) is a Cameroonian professional footballer who plays as a central midfielder for UD Las Palmas.

Club career

Barcelona
Born in Douala, Kaptoum joined FC Barcelona's youth ranks in 2008, aged 12, after a stint in Samuel Eto'o's foundation. He was subsequently loaned to neighbouring UE Sant Andreu, and in June 2014 was promoted to the reserves in Segunda División.

Kaptoum played his first match as a professional on 23 August 2014, starting in a 0–2 away loss against CA Osasuna. He scored his first goal on 19 October, netting the second in a 4–1 home win against AD Alcorcón. On 28 October 2015, Kaptoum made his debut for Barcelona's first team, starting in a goalless draw away to CF Villanovense in the season's Copa del Rey.

Kaptoum's first appearance in the UEFA Champions League came on 9 December 2015, in a 1–1 draw away to Leverkusen. In another 1–1 draw game against Valencia CF on 10 February 2016, he scored his debut goal for the first team 2 minutes after coming in as a substitute in the second leg of Copa del Rey semifinals. His goal also served to extend FC Barcelona's unbeaten run to 29 games, breaking the previous record of 28 games set under Pep Guardiola in the 2010–11 season.

Kaptoum sustained a knee injury which kept him out of action for five months. He returned to fitness in December 2017. On 29 January 2018, he agreed to terminate his contract with Barcelona.

Betis
On 31 January 2018, two days after leaving Barcelona, Kaptoum signed with Real Betis and was initially assigned to the B-team. He made his first team debut on 4 October, replacing Sergio León in a 3–0 home defeat of F91 Dudelange, for the season's UEFA Europa League.

Kaptoum made his La Liga debut on 3 February 2019, playing the full 90 minutes in a 1–0 home win against Atlético Madrid. On 10 January 2020, Kaptoum joined UD Almería on loan for the remainder of the season.

On 5 October 2020, Kaptoum terminated his contract with the Verdiblancos.

New England Revolution
On 23 December 2020, the New England Revolution of Major League Soccer announced the signing of Kaptoum on a free transfer. He scored his first goal for the club against Chicago Fire on 16 October 2021. Following the 2022 season, New England opted to decline his contract option.

Las Palmas
On 13 January 2023, Kaptoum returned to Spain and its second division, after signing a short-term deal with UD Las Palmas.

Career statistics

Club

Honours
Barcelona
Copa del Rey: 2015–16
UEFA Youth League: 2013–14

New England Revolution
Supporters' Shield: 2021

References

External links
 
 
 

1996 births
Living people
Footballers from Douala
Cameroonian footballers
Association football midfielders
La Liga players
Segunda División players
Segunda División B players
Tercera División players
FC Barcelona Atlètic players
FC Barcelona players
Betis Deportivo Balompié footballers
Real Betis players
UD Almería players
New England Revolution players
UD Las Palmas players
Cameroon under-20 international footballers
Cameroonian expatriate footballers
Expatriate footballers in Spain
Cameroonian expatriate sportspeople in Spain
2019 Africa Cup of Nations players
Expatriate soccer players in the United States
Cameroonian expatriate sportspeople in the United States
Major League Soccer players